Sierra High School was the second high school to be built in Colorado Springs' School District 2. It is the most populated high school in its district.

The school's mascot is a Stallion, and the school colors are cardinal and gold.

Colorado Springs offers concurrent enrollment courses, open Advanced Placement classes, and Colorado State University partnered with the school, in which Sierra graduates receive a $16,000 scholarship to attend CSU-Fort Collins.

References

External links
 

Public high schools in Colorado
High schools in Colorado Springs, Colorado